John Poole (1786–1872), an English playwright, was one of the earliest and best known 19th century playwrights of the comic drama, the farce.

Biography
Paul Pry is considered his most notable work, while Hamlet Travestie, performed as a burlesque, was the first Shakespeare parody since the Restoration.

He was buried in a common grave, plot no.18577, on the eastern side of Highgate Cemetery.

Partial works
Plays
 Hamlet travestie: in three acts (1810)
 Othello-travestie in three acts. (1813)
 The hole in the wall: a farce, in two acts (1813)
 Intrigue, or, Married yesterday: a comic interlude, in one act (1814)
 Who's who?, or, The double imposture: a farce, in two acts (1815)
 A short reign and a merry one: a petite comedy, in two acts (1819). First performed at the Theatre Royal, Covent Garden on 1819-11-19
 The two pages of Frederick the Great: a comic piece, in two acts (1821)
 Deaf as a post: a farce, in one act, two scenes (1823) First performed at Drury Lane February, 1823.
 Simpson and Co. a comedy in one act (1823)
 A year in an hour, or, The cock of the walk: a farce, in two acts (1824)
 Scapegoat: a farce, in one act (1824)
 Paul Pry: a comedy, in three acts (1825)
 Tribulation, or, Unwelcome visitors: a comedy, in two acts (1825)
 Twixt the Cup and Lip (1827)
 Simpson & co. : a comedy, in two acts (1827)
 The wife's stratagem, or, more frightened than hurt : a comedy, in three acts (1827)
 The wealthy widow, or, They're both to blame: a comedy, in three acts (1827)
 Lodgings for Single Gentlemen (1829)
 Turning the tables: a farce, in one act (1830)
 Past and present; or, The hidden treasure: a drama, in three acts (1830)
 Old and young, a farce, in one act. (1831) First performed at English Opera Company, Theatre Royal, Adelphi with 31 performances during the period of 1831-07-04 through 1831-09-28
 A soldier's courtship; [or love at first sight: a comedy, in one act. (1833)
 Patrician & parvenu, or, Confusion worse confounded: a comedy, in five acts (1835)
 Atonement, or, The god-daughter: a drama, in two acts (1836)
 'Twould puzzle a conjurer, or, The two Peters (1838)
 The atonement; or, The God-daughter: a drama, in two acts (1840)
 Rumfuskin, King of the North Pole, or, Treason rewarded: a tragedy for the first of April (1841)
 Phineas Quiddy, or, Sheer industry (1842)
 Lodgings for single gentlemen a farce in one act (1850)
 Scan. Mag, or, The village gossip: a popular farce, in two acts (1850)
 The Dutch governor, or, 'Twould puzzle a conjuror : a modern standard drama (185-)
 Intrigue, or, The Bath road ; a comic interlude, in one act (186?)
 My wife! What wife? a farce, in one or two acts (1872)
 Match making: a petite comedy, in one act (18--)
 A pair of razors : a farce, in one act (18--)
 Uncle Sam, or, A nabob for an hour: a farce, in two acts

Other
 Two papers : a theatrical critique and an essay (being no. 999 of the Pretender) on sonnet-writing, and sonnet-writers in general : including a Sonnet on myself (1819)
 Phineas Quiddy A new novel. (1842)
 Paul Pry's Journal of a residence at Little Pedlington. (1836)
 Little Pedlington and the Pedlingtonians (1839) (expanded version of 1836 Paul Pry's Journal)
 Christmas festivities: tales, sketches, and characters, with Beauties of the modern drama, in four specimens (1845)

References

 Stanley W. Wells. Nineteenth-century Shakespeare Burlesques: John Poole and his imitators. Diploma Press, 1977

External links

 Works by John Poole at Google Books
 
 Works by John Poole at The Online Books Page
 Portraits at the National Portrait Gallery

1786 births
1872 deaths
Burials at Highgate Cemetery
English dramatists and playwrights
English male dramatists and playwrights